Tomorrow We Move is a 2004, French-Belgian comedy film directed by Chantal Akerman. It won the Lumières Award for Best French-Language Film in 2005.

Cast 
 Sylvie Testud as Charlotte 
 Aurore Clément as Catherine 
 Jean-Pierre Marielle as Popernick 
 Natacha Régnier as The Pregnant Woman
 Lucas Belvaux as M. Delacre 
 Dominique Reymond as Mme Delacre 
 Elsa Zylberstein as Michèle 
 Anne Coesens as Mme Dietrich
 Eric Godon as Mover

References

External links 
 

2004 films
2004 comedy films
2000s French-language films
French comedy films
Films directed by Chantal Akerman
Belgian comedy films
Best French-Language Film Lumières Award winners
Films produced by Paulo Branco
French-language Belgian films
2000s French films